James Mangles  (1786 – 18 November 1867) was an officer of the Royal Navy, naturalist, horticulturalist and writer. He served during the French Revolutionary and Napoleonic Wars, rising to the rank of captain. In the post-war period, with his brothers Robert and George, who shared his interests in horticulture, botany and plant collection, James was actively involved in the botanical, horticultural and commercial life of early colonial Western Australia.

Life
Mangles was the son of John Mangles (1760–1837), brother of James Mangles (1762–1838), the Member of Parliament.

He was sent home in acting command of the sloop,  and was confirmed in the rank of captain on 13 June 1815. This was his last service afloat.

In 1816 Mangles left England, with his old messmate in the Narcissus, Captain Charles Leonard Irby, on what proved to be a lengthy tour in Europe, Egypt, Syria, and Asia Minor. They travelled with William John Bankes and Thomas Legh. Mangles was elected a Fellow of the Royal Society in 1825, and in 1830 was co-founder and one of the first fellows and members of council of the Royal Geographical Society.

In 1831 Mangles visited the Swan River Colony in Australia. His cousin Ellen Stirling (née Mangles) was wife of Lieutenant Governor James Stirling. On his return Mangles went into business with his brother Robert, and commissioned James Drummond to collect seeds, plants and herbarium specimens, which they sold to nurserymen. Mangles corresponded with several members of the Swan River Colony regarding matters of a botanical nature. The colonists included Georgiana Molloy, George Fletcher Moore, Captain Richard Goldsmith Meares, Ellen Stirling, James Drummond, Henry Mortlock Ommanney, and Sir Richard Spencer.

The names of several Western Australian plants honour members of the Mangles family, including the floral emblem of the State of Western Australia, Anigozanthos manglesii (the red and green or Mangles kangaroo paw), named for Robert, who grew the specimen from seed in his English garden; and Melaleuca manglesii, Grevillea manglesii, Rhodanthe manglesii and Ptilotus manglesii (pom poms), named for James.

Mangles died at Fairfield, Exeter, on 18 November 1867, aged 81.

Works
The letters of Irby and Mangles were privately printed in 1823, and were published as a volume of John Murray III's Home and Colonial Library in 1844. Mangles was also the author of:

 The Floral Calendar, 1839, a short work on window and town gardening; 
 Synopsis of a Complete Dictionary ... of the Illustrated Geographically and Hydrography of England and Wales, Scotland and Ireland, 1848; 
 Papers and Despatches relating to the Arctic Searching Expeditions of 1850-1-2, 1852; and 
 The Thames Estuary, a Guide to the Navigation of the Thames Mouth, 1853.

Notes

External links
 
  Index
Attribution

1786 births
1867 deaths
Royal Navy officers
Fellows of the Royal Society
Fellows of the Royal Geographical Society
English writers
Royal Navy personnel of the French Revolutionary Wars
Royal Navy personnel of the Napoleonic Wars
English male writers
Travelers in Asia Minor